}}

Sitara Hewitt (also known as Tara Hewitt; born 27 December 1981) is a Canadian American film and television actress.

Background
Sitara Hewitt is the daughter of a Pakistani mother, Dr. Farida Hewitt and a Welsh father, Dr. Kenneth Hewitt. Her parents are professors at Wilfrid Laurier University. Sitara was raised primarily in Elora, Ontario, where she attended St. John's-Kilmarnock School. During her childhood she spent time living in the Himalayan mountains, specifically in the Hunza Valley of Gilgit-Baltistan where her parents did their academic field research on both the glaciers and in the small villages in the valleys.

Hewitt was married to American actor Jessie Pavelka and they have a son, Rowan, who was born in 2010. Pavelka and Hewitt separated in 2015 and divorced late 2016. But they remarried 2022.
She is fluent in both Urdu, and English and is semi-fluent in Balti. Hewitt was raised Christian as both of her parents are Anglican Christians. Her first name "Sitara", means "star" in Urdu.

Hewitt revealed in a post that she had been a citizen of the United States for some time.

Career 
In Canada Hewitt starred on CBC Television's Little Mosque on the Prairie as Dr. Rayyan Hamoudi for 6 seasons. She is known across America as the Spokesperson for Hughesnet internet.  She was a recurring on CBS's The Young and the Restless as well as on All Rise and plays the lead in several Hallmark Movies. She was also a co-host on the Comedy Network's pop-culture game show You Bet Your Ass.

She owns a Meditation company, and is a wellness expert.  Hewitt also hosted TV shows for Sportsnet and TSN while studying acting in Toronto and trained with World Wrestling Entertainment in the United States.

Filmography

References

External links
The Hour Interview with George Stroumboulopoulos

andPOP Interview
Sitara Hewitt Biography

1981 births
Living people
Canadian Anglicans
Canadian people of Welsh descent
Canadian television actresses
People from Centre Wellington
Actresses from Ontario
Canadian actresses of Pakistani descent
21st-century Canadian actresses
Canadian emigrants to the United States
Naturalized citizens of the United States
American Anglicans
American people of Welsh descent
American people of Pakistani descent